List of Sabre and Fury units in the US military identifies the military branches and units that used the North American Aviation F-86 Sabre and FJ Fury. Units existed in regular USAF, ANG, USN, and USMC squadrons.

USAF F-86 Units
 Source: Baugher F-86D

Air National Guard Squadrons 
102d, New York ANG (1957–1959)
104th, Massachusetts ANG (1957–1965)
111th, Texas ANG (1957–1960)
113th, Indiana ANG (1956-1958)
120th, Colorado ANG (1960–1961)
122d, Louisiana ANG (1957–1960)
125th, Oklahoma ANG (1957–1960)
127th, 184th Wing Kansas ANG (1958–1961)
128th, Georgia ANG (1960–1961)
133d, New Hampshire ANG (1958–1960)
146th, Pennsylvania ANG (1957–1960)
147th, Pennsylvania ANG (1958–1961)
151st, Tennessee ANG (1957–1960)
156th, North Carolina ANG (1959–1960)
157th, South Carolina ANG (1958–1960)
159th, Florida ANG (1956–1960)
163rd, Indiana ANG (1956-1958)
173d, Nebraska ANG (1957–1964)
181st, Texas ANG (1957–1964)
182d, Texas ANG (1957–1960)
185th, Oklahoma ANG (1958–1961)
186th, Montana ANG (1953–1955)
187th, Wyoming ANG (1958–1961)
190th, Idaho ANG (1959–1964)
191st, Utah ANG (1958–1961)
192d, Nevada ANG (1958–1961)
194th, California ANG (1958–1965)
196th, California ANG (1958–1965)
197th, Arizona ANG (1957–1960)
198th, Puerto Rico ANG (1958–1960)
199th, Hawaii ANG (1958–1961)

Air Force units 
 Source: Baugher F-86F and F-86E

1st Fighter Interceptor Wing—F-86E
4th Fighter Interceptor Wing (334th, 335th, 336th Squadrons) -- F-86E, F
8th Fighter Bomber Wing (35th, 36th, 80th Squadrons) -- F-86F
18th Fighter Interceptor Wing (12th, 44th, 55th Squadrons) -- F-86F
21st Fighter Interceptor Wing (92d, 416th, 531st Squadrons)-- F-86F
33d Fighter Interceptor Wing (58th, 59th, 60th Squadrons) -- F-86E
36th Fighter Interceptor Wing (23d, 32d, 53d Squadrons) -- F-86F
48th Fighter Interceptor Wing (492d, 493d, 494th Squadrons)-- F-86F
50th Fighter Bomber Wing (10th, 81st, 417th Squadrons) -- F-86F
51st Fighter Interceptor Wing (16th, 25th, 39th Squadrons) -- F-86E, F
56th Fighter Interceptor Wing (61st, 62nd, 63rd Squadrons) -- F-86E
58th Fighter Interceptor Wing (69th, 310th, 311th Squadrons) -- F-86F
81st Fighter Interceptor Wing (78th, 91st, 92d Squadrons)  -- F-86F
312th Fighter Bomber Wing (386th, 387th, 388th Squadrons) -- F-86H
322d Fighter Interceptor Wing (450th, 451st, 452d Squadrons)  -- F-86F
366th Fighter Interceptor Wing (389th, 390th, 391st Squadrons) -- F-86F
388th Fighter Interceptor Wing (561st, 562d, 563d Squadrons)  -- F-86F
406th Fighter Interceptor Wing (512th, 513th, 514th Squadrons) -- F-86F
450th Fighter Interceptor Wing (721st, 722d, 723d Squadrons) -- F-86F
474th Fighter Interceptor Wing (428th, 429th, 430th Squadrons)  -- F-86F
479th Fighter Interceptor Wing (431st, 434th, 435th Squadrons) -- F-86F

US Navy units with FJ Fury 
 Source: Baugher Fury

Atlantic Fleet 
 FJ-3: VF-3, VF-33
 VF-173 based at Jacksonville, Florida, Sept. 1954
 FJ-3M: VA-172, VF-12, VF-62, VF-73, VF-84, VF-17.
 FJ-3D2: Guided Missile Squadron TWO / VU-8.

Pacific Fleet 
 FJ-3: VF-24, VF-91, VF-154, VF-191, VF-211 Guided Missile Group one- GMGRU-1 Barbers Point, Oahu HI.
 FJ-3M: VF-21, VF-51, VF-121, VF-142, VF-143, VF-211.
 FJ-4B: VA-192, VA-146

Carriers 
  on May 8, 1955
  on Jan. 4, 1956, VF-21
  1957-58

US Marine Corps units with FJ Fury 
 VMF-122
 VMF-232
 VMF-235
 VMF-313
 VMF-323
 VMF-333
 VMF-334
 VMF-351

References

Notes

Bibliography 

 Baugher, Joe. "North American F-86 Sabre." American Military Aircraft, 5 November 1999. Retrieved: 10 June 2011.
 Allward, Maurice. F-86 Sabre. London: Ian Allan, 1978. .
 Curtis, Duncan. North American F-86 Sabre. Ramsbury, UK: Crowood, 2000. .
 Dorr, Robert F. F-86 Sabre Jet: History of the Sabre and FJ Fury. St. Paul, Minnesota: Motorbooks International Publishers, 1993. .
 Knaack, Marcelle Size. Encyclopedia of US Air Force Aircraft and Missile Systems, Volume 1, Post-World War Two Fighters, 1945–1973. Washington, DC: Office of Air Force History, 1978. .
 Swanborough, F. Gordon. United States Military Aircraft Since 1909. London: Putnam, 1963. .
 Wagner, Ray. American Combat Planes Second Edition. New York: Doubleday and Company, 1968. .
 Wagner, Ray. The North American Sabre. London: Macdonald, 1963. No ISBN.

Military units and formations of the United States Air Force by equipment
Units (American)